This is a list of lakes in the state of New York in the United States.  The list is not exhaustive.

 Adirondack Lake
 Ampersand Lake
 Atwood Lake
 Avalanche Lake
 Augur Lake
 Bailey Pond
 Ballston Lake
 Basket Pond
 Bass Lake
 Bear Cub Pond
 Beaverdam Lake
 Big Diamond Pond
 Big Moose Lake
 Blackfoot Pond
 Black Lake
 Blue Mountain Lake
 Brantingham Lake
 Brydon Lake
 Buck Horn Lake
 Busfield Pond
 Cables Lake
 East Canada Lake
 West Canada Lake
 Canadice Lake
 Canaan Lake
 Canadarago Lake
 Canandaigua Lake
 Caroga Lake
 Catlin Lake
 Cayuga Lake
 Cayuta Lake
 Cazenovia Lake
 Chadwick Lake 
 Chateaugay Lake
 Chautauqua Lake
 Chazy Lake
 Chisholm Pond
 Clapper Lake
 Columbia Lake
 Combs Lake
 Conesus Lake
 Cossayuna Lake
 Cranberry Lake
 Cross Lake
 Dart Lake
 Lake Delaware
 Delta Lake
 Duck Lake
 Dwight Pond
 Eagle Lake, Essex County
 Eagle Lake, Hamilton County
 Eagle Lake, Orange County
 East Caroga Lake
 Elk Lake
 Elm Lake
 Elm Swamp
 Emmons Pond
 Fern Lake
 Finger Lakes
 Forked Lake
 Fulton Chain Lakes
 Galway Lake
 Garnet Lake 
 Great Sacandaga Lake
 Green Lake
 Greenwood Lake (extends into New Jersey)
 Harris Lake
 Hathaway Pond
 Heart Lake
 Hedges Lake
 Henderson Lake
 Hemlock Lake 
 Hiawatha Lake
 Hicks Pond
 Honeoye Lake 
 Huggins Lake
 Indian Lake
 Kendall Pond
 Keuka Lake
 Kiwassa Lake
 Labrador pond
 Lake Abanakee
 Lake Algonquin 
 Lake Ann
 Lake Bonaparte
 Lake Bonita
 Lake Champlain
 Lake Clear
 Lake Colden
 Lake Durant
 Lake Edward
 Lake Erie
 Lake Flower
 Lake George
 Lake Gilead
 Lake Kanawauke
 Lake Kushaqua
 Lake Lila
 Lake Louise Marie
 Lake Madeline
 Lake Maratanza
 Lake Neatahwanta
 Lake Ontario
 Lake Oscawana
 Lake Ozonia
 Lake Peekskill
 Lake Placid 
 Lake Pleasant 
 Lake Ronkonkoma
 Lake Sebago
 Lake Skanatani / Skannatani (official spelling varies)
 Lake Taghkanic
 Lake Tappan
 Lake Tear of the Clouds
 Lake Tiorati
 Lake Tittykuku
 Lake Titus
 Lake Washington
 Lake Welsh 
 Lamoka Lake
 Lewey Lake
 Little Sacandaga
 Little Tupper Lake
 Long Lake
 Loon Lake (Franklin County, New York)
 Loon Lake (Steuben County, New York)
 Loon Lake (Warren County, New York)
 Lower Ausable Lake
 Lower Chateaugay Lake
 Lower St. Regis Lake
 Lower Saranac Lake
 Lows Lake
 Mason Lake
 Masten Lake
 Meacham Lake
 Middle Saranac Lake
 Mirror Lake
 Mohegan Lake
 Mountain Lake
 Mud Lake (more than 30 in New York)
 Murphy Lake
 Nassau Lake, Rensselaer County
 Newcomb Lake
 North Lake
 North-South Lake
 Notch Lake
 Oneida Lake
 Onondaga Lake
 Onteora Lake
 Oseetah Lake
 Otisco Lake 
 Otsego Lake
 Oquaga Lake
 Owasco Lake
 Oxbow Lake
 Paradox Lake
 Pleasant Lake
 Ragged Lake
 Rainbow Lake 
 Raquette Lake
 Rich Lake 
 Rockland Lake
 Rondax Lake
 Round Lake
 Rushford Lake
 Sacandaga Lake
 Schroon Lake
 Saratoga Lake
 Seneca Lake
 Seven Hills Lake
 Sleepy Hollow Lake
 Star Lake
 Silver Lake (Clinton County)
 Silver Lake (Sullivan County)
 Silver Lake (Wyoming County)
 Skaneateles Lake
 Snowbird Lake
 Snyder's Lake
 South Lake
 Spring Lake (Delaware County)
 Spring Lake (Rensselaer County)
 Sterling Lake
 Summit Lake (Edmeston)
 Summit Lake (Philmont)
 Summit Lake (Springfield)
 Taylor Pond
 Tomahawk Lake
 Tonetta Lake
 Triangle Lake
 Tripp Lake
 Trout Lake (Warren County, New York)
 Trout Lake (Arietta, Hamilton County, New York)
 Trout Lake (Morehouse, Hamilton County, New York) 
 Tsatsawassa Lake, Nassau, Rensselaer County, New York
 Tupper Lake 
 Upper Ausable Lake
 Upper Chateaugay Lake
 Upper St. Regis Lake
 Upper Saranac Lake
 Utowana Lake
 Wanaksink Lake
 Wanita Lake
 Wawaka Lake
 White Lake
 Wildwood Lake
 Wolf Lake
 Yankee Lake

See also

 List of reservoirs and dams in New York
 List of rivers of New York
 List of mountains in New York

References

 
New York
Lakes